Hazal Türesan (born 20 July 1985) is a Turkish actress. She appeared in Kara Para Aşk as Asli Denizer, Tatli Intikam as Başak, Fazilet Hanim ve Kizlari as Yasemin and Mucize Doktor as Beliz.

Filmography

Television

Film

References

External links
 
 
 

1985 births
Living people
Turkish television actresses
Actresses from Ankara
Ankara University alumni